Runish Gudhka (born 6 September 1989) is a Kenyan cricketer who played for the national side. He has played in two One Day International matches and last played cricket in 2012.

References

External links
 

1989 births
Living people
Kenyan cricketers
Kenya One Day International cricketers
Cricketers from Nairobi